"So Gone (What My Mind Says)" is a song by R&B poet Jill Scott featuring rapper Paul Wall. It is the second official single from her #1 album, The Light of the Sun.

Song Information
The song was released in October 2011, and has peaked at #28 on the U.S. Billboard Hot R&B/Hip-Hop Songs charts and #7 on the Adult Contemporary Charts.

Video

Although on August 26, 2011, a tour video of "So Gone" was released featuring a live performance of the song, Scott tweeted in late summer that she had in fact shot a video for "So Gone" with Paul Wall being featured. On September 13, 2011, a video still was released on Scott's official website stating that the video will be released soon. On Thursday, October 27, 2011 E! Online premiered the video online. It later aired on E!.

Charts

Weekly charts

Year-end charts

References

2011 singles
Jill Scott (singer) songs
Paul Wall songs
2011 songs
Songs written by Jill Scott (singer)
Warner Music Group singles
Songs written by Paul Wall
Hip hop soul songs